Egg pie is a sweet Filipino pie with an egg custard filling and a characteristic toasty brown top made from egg whites. It is made with flour, sugar, milk, butter, and eggs. Calamansi juice or zest may also be added. It is a type of custard pie. Egg pies are commonly sold in bakeries in the Philippines.

See also
 Custard pie
 Egg tart
 Buko pie
 Yema (candy)

References

Philippine pastries